The Kizil massacre occurred in June 1933, when Uighur and Kirghiz Turkic fighters of the First East Turkestan Republic broke their agreement not to attack a column of retreating Hui Chinese soldiers and civilians from Yarkand New City on their way to Kashgar. An estimated 800 Chinese Muslim and Chinese civilians were killed by Turkic Muslim fighters.

See also 
List of massacres in China

References 

1933 in China
June 1933 events
Massacres in 1933
Massacres in China
20th century in Xinjiang
Mass murder in 1933
1933 murders in China